The Sarasău is a left tributary of the river Tisza in Romania. It discharges into the Tisza in Sarasău, on the border with Ukraine.

References

Rivers of Romania
Rivers of Maramureș County